Dr. Alastair Carmichael MacWillson is a British cyber security professional. MacWillson is chair of the Institute of Information Security Professionals, and of Qufaro, and a founding director of Cambridge Analytica. He is, additionally, a principal at the Chertoff Group.

MacWillson spent 17 years in the British Foreign Service, working on technical and political risk analysis in the former USSR, the Middle East and the United States.

Biography
Alastair Carmichael MacWillson is a British intelligence, security and cyber security professional. MacWillson is chair of the Institute of Information Security Professionals, and of Qufaro, and a founding director of Cambridge Analytica. He is, additionally, a principal at the Chertoff Group.

MacWillson is referenced as spending 16 years in the British Foreign Service, working on technical and political risk analysis in the former USSR, the Middle East and the United States.

However, this was a cover for his real job, as an officer in MI6.  He was a direct recruit into the SIS from university, when Oldfield was Chief, and initially specialised in the terrorist threat in Northern Ireland. In 1980, he was posted as a senior intelligence officer in the Oman Research Department (Now Internal Security Service) which was then staffed by several senior SIS and GCHQ personnel, and was Director of Operations until 1989. During that time, he worked with the CIA in establishing a joint US/UK Rapid Deployment Force to combat terrorist events.    

He returned to the UK in late 1989. In 1990, he published an HMG sanctioned book entitled Hostage-Taking Terrorism. 

Since 1990, MacWillson had a roving HQ brief as a problem solver and was alleged to have set up a special operations group within SIS.

References

Computer security specialists
Living people
Year of birth missing (living people)
Cambridge Analytica
British diplomats
British computer specialists